The Wardle Canal is the shortest canal in the UK, at . The canal, in Middlewich, Cheshire, connects the Trent and Mersey Canal to the Middlewich Branch of the Shropshire Union Canal, terminating with a single lock known as Wardle Lock. It was built in 1829 so that the navigation authority of the Trent and Mersey Canal could maintain control over the junction.

Maureen Shaw
Maureen Shaw, a boatwoman who was well known to passing boaters as well as the local and canal community, lived in the Lock Cottage at Wardle Lock for many years, with the result that it was often referred to as "Maureen’s Lock". Following her death in 2012, a memorial panel was placed at the lock in her honour.

See also

Canals of Great Britain
History of the British canal system
Four Counties Ring – a canal cruising ring that includes the Wardle Canal

References

External links

Jim Shead's entry on the Wardle Canal

Middlewich
Transport in Cheshire
Canals in Cheshire
Trent and Mersey Canal
Canals opened in 1829
1829 establishments in England